Kim Sung-joon (born 21 October 1973) is a South Korean sport shooter who competed in the 1996 Summer Olympics.

References

1973 births
Living people
South Korean male sport shooters
ISSF pistol shooters
Olympic shooters of South Korea
Shooters at the 1996 Summer Olympics
Shooters at the 1998 Asian Games
Shooters at the 2002 Asian Games
Asian Games medalists in shooting
Asian Games silver medalists for South Korea
Medalists at the 1998 Asian Games
Medalists at the 2002 Asian Games
20th-century South Korean people
21st-century South Korean people